Herona sumatrana, the White Pasha, is a species of butterfly in the family Nymphalidae. It is found in South-East Asia.

Subspecies
Herona sumatrana sumatrana (Sumatra)
Herona sumatrana dusuntua Corbet, 1937 (Peninsular Malaya)
Herona sumatrana schoenbergi Staudinger, 1890 (Borneo)
Herona sumatrana djarang Fruhstorfer, 1893 (Nias)
Herona sumatrana pringondani Fruhstorfer, 1893 (Java and possibly Bali)

References

Butterflies described in 1881
Herona
Butterflies of Borneo
Butterflies of Java
Butterflies of Indochina
Taxa named by Frederic Moore